Ladwa village, (not to be confused with Ladwa town in Kurukshetra district), is a village on Hisar-Tosham road in Hisar district and Hisar division in the state of Haryana in northwestern India. The village is mostly of Hindu Jaat people.Temple of Baba Nihal giri ji has established in village since long time.

Location
It lies on Hisar-Tosham road to the east of the college.

Shri Ladwa Gaushala
Shri Ladwa Gaushala cow protection shelter is located here.

Ladwa Cancer Center
Ladwa Cancer Center is located here.

Education
 Shanti Niketan Vidyapeeth, Hisar has following colleges:
 Shanti Niketan College of Engineering
 Shanti Niketan Institute of Engineering & Technology
 SD Shanti Niketan Institute of Engineering & Technology
 Shanti Niketan College of Education Official website
 Shanti Niketan College

See also 

 Kanwari
 Hisar district
 List of universities and colleges in Hisar
 List of schools in Hisar
 List of institutions of higher education in Haryana

External links 
 
 
 Google map
 Shanti Niketan Youtube intro
 Shri Ladwa Gaushala and Prakritik Chikitshala

References

Cities and towns in Hisar district
Villages in Hisar district
Hisar (city)